Natascha Ochsenknecht ( Wierichs; born 17 August 1964) is a German actress and former model.

She has three children with actor Uwe Ochsenknecht: Wilson Gonzalez, Jimi Blue and Cheyenne. Since 2010, she has been in a relationship with former German-Turkish footballer Umut Kekıllı.

References

External links 
 
 Official website (in German)

German television actresses
Ich bin ein Star – Holt mich hier raus! participants
1964 births
Living people